HMS Surprise is a modern tall ship built at Lunenburg, Nova Scotia, Canada.

As HMS Rose
The ship was meant to be a close replica of the original Rose, but still fill a commercial function. John Fitzhugh Millar who commissioned the ship build gave Bolger copies of the original British Admiralty drawings, Bolger modified the hull shape below the water line, sharpening up her entry so she sailed to windward better. Unlike some square-riggers, she could sail two points (22-1/2 degrees) on the wind provided that seas remained under four feet or so. Bolger also changed the arrangement of her decks, at the bank's insistence, so that she could be used as a tavern and restaurant, though she was never used as such.

The ship was inspected and certified by the United States Coast Guard. She spent the first ten years of her life in Newport, Rhode Island sailing in Newport Harbor and as a dockside attraction.

In the summer of 1972, Rose was hired for the film The Man Without a Country, a made-for-television production. Norman Rosemont Productions couldn't find the money to take the ship out sailing, so all the filming was shot with sails set, as the ship was securely moored to the pier, next to the causeway to Goat Island. During filming Cliff Robertson had to hide that he had a broken leg at the time.

In 1984, already in serious disrepair, she was purchased by Kaye Williams and brought to Bridgeport, Connecticut, and operated as a sail training vessel in the 1980s and 1990s, run by the HMS Rose Foundation based in Bridgeport, Connecticut, United States. In her lifetime as Rose, her figurehead had to be replaced twice, each time slightly upgraded. One was damaged in a storm off Bermuda on her way to Norfolk, Virginia in June 1998. The figurehead was named in fun as "Chester" by the crew.

Transformation into HMS Surprise

The ship was sold to the 20th Century Fox film studio in March 2001, and underwent extensive modifications to be used in the making of the film Master and Commander: The Far Side of the World, in which she portrayed the Royal Navy frigate HMS  with a story based on several of the books by Patrick O'Brian. The modifications included a reshaped stern, all deck structures removed, the single ship's wheel replaced by a double wheel, period fighting tops fitted, new sails, and the figurehead replaced.

Renaming as HMS Surprise
After the film was complete, the ship was leased and then purchased by the Maritime Museum of San Diego which has restored her to sailing condition as of September 2007. The ship has officially been re-registered as "HMS Surprise" in honor of her role in the film. She sails several times a year, often with the museum's other tall ships, the schooner  and the 1863 barque . In 2010, she portrayed HMS Providence in the Disney adventure film Pirates of the Caribbean: On Stranger Tides.

Related facts
Although she is known by the prefix HMS, meaning Her (or His) Majesty's Ship, she is not, and had never been, commissioned in the Royal Navy.

In 1991, the Connecticut General Assembly passed "An Act Concerning the HMS Rose" in which the ship was commissioned as a vessel of the Connecticut Naval Militia.  The act stated that the H.M.S. Rose Foundation was responsible for maintaining the ship, but when the ship was sold to 20th Century Fox, the statute was not repealed and is still in effect.

References

External links

 Maritime Museum of San Diego page on the Surprise 
 Photo gallery of Surprise in San Diego, October 2005

1970 ships
Ships built in Nova Scotia
Maritime Museum of San Diego
Museum ships in San Diego
Individual sailing vessels
Sail training ships
Tall ships of the United States
Replica ships